Anne-Marie Mastraccio is an American politician from Maine. Mastraccio, a Democrat from Sanford, Maine, has served in the Maine House of Representatives since December 2012.

Positions
In 2017, Mastraccio co-sponsored a bill to reverse scheduled increases in the tipped minimum wage. The minimum wage increase was passed via a citizen's initiative in November 2016.

References

Year of birth missing (living people)
Living people
People from Sanford, Maine
Democratic Party members of the Maine House of Representatives
Women state legislators in Maine
Place of birth missing (living people)
21st-century American politicians
21st-century American women politicians